Kangani is a village on the island of Anjouan in the Comoros. According to the 1991 census the town had a population of 2,308. The current calculation for 2012 is 4,416 people

References

Populated places in Anjouan